Cailtram son of Girom was a king of the Picts from 537 to 538.

The Pictish Chronicle king lists have him ruling for one or six years between his brother Gartnait son of Girom and Talorc son of Muircholach. No two lists which give a possibly authentic version of his name agree on its form, variants including Cailtarni and Cailtaine. Later versions include Kelhiran, Kelturan and Kyburcan.

He is the third son of Girom listed as king, although Drest son of Girom is not explicitly stated to have been a brother of Cailtram and Gartnait.

References
Anderson, Alan Orr, Early Sources of Scottish History A.D 500–1286, volume 1. Reprinted with corrections. Paul Watkins, Stamford, 1990.

External links
Pictish Chronicle

538 deaths
Pictish monarchs
6th-century Scottish monarchs
Year of birth unknown